Melanchra adjuncta, the hitched arch, is a species of cutworm or dart moth in the family Noctuidae. It is found in North America.

The MONA or Hodges number for Melanchra adjuncta is 10292.

References

Further reading

External links

 

Melanchra
Articles created by Qbugbot
Moths described in 1852